Rab escort protein 1 (REP1) also known as rab proteins geranylgeranyltransferase component A 1 is an enzyme that in humans is encoded by the CHM gene.

Function 

This gene encodes component A of the RAB geranylgeranyl transferase holoenzyme. In the dimeric holoenzyme, this subunit binds unprenylated Rab GTPases and then presents them to the catalytic Rab GGTase subunit for the geranylgeranyl transfer reaction. Rab GTPases need to be  on either one or two cysteine residues in their C-terminus to localize to the correct intracellular membrane.

Interactions 

CHM (gene) has been shown to interact with RAB1A, RAB7A and RAB3A.

Clinical significance 

Mutations in this gene are a cause of choroideremia; also known as tapetochoroidal dystrophy (TCD). This X-linked disease is characterized by progressive dystrophy of the choroid, retinal pigment epithelium and retina.

See also 
 Rab (G-protein)

References

Further reading

External links 
  GeneReviews/NCBI/NIH/UW entry on Choroideremia